Marques Reid Whippy (born February 5, 1986) is a Fijian former professional basketball player. He played college basketball for Brigham Young University in Hawaii before playing professionally in Spain, Australia, Chile and New Zealand. He has been a regular member of the Fijian national team.

Early life and college
Born in Suva, Fiji, to parents Paul and Olive, Whippy was the third eldest of six children. Despite growing up in a rugby dominated country, Whippy started playing basketball at a young age due to family influence – both his parents played and coached basketball at some level in Fiji. At the age of 14, he represented the country internationally for the first time, and in 2002 he played for Fiji at the Oceania Youth Tournament in Tonga.

Whippy attended LDS Church College in Suva before moving to the United States in 2003, where he spent his last year of secondary school at Woods Cross High School in Woods Cross, Utah. There, he played 4A state basketball.

After serving a two-year Mormon mission with the Church of Jesus Christ of Latter-day Saints, Whippy joined the BYU–Hawaii Seasiders men's basketball team for the 2007–08 season. His size and physical abilities became an instrument for the Seasiders. During his junior year in 2009–10, he was awarded first team all-conference and led his team to the Division II National Championship held in Springfield, Massachusetts. He improved further as a senior in 2010–11 as he earned the Pacific West Player of the Year award and finished his four-year career at BYU–Hawaii with a school-record of 245 steals. In 31 games (30 starts) as a senior, he averaged 14.2 points, 11.5 rebounds, 3.5 assists, 2.8 steals, 1.3 blocks in 31.2 minutes per game.

Professional career

Spain
In August 2011, Whippy signed a one-year deal with Bàsquet Mallorca of the LEB Oro. In 31 games for Mallorca in 2011–12, he averaged 8.8 points and 5.2 rebounds per game.

Australia
In April 2012, following the conclusion of the LEB Oro season, Whippy moved to Australia and joined the Brisbane Spartans for the 2012 SEABL season. An ankle injury sidelined him for three weeks during May. In 20 games for Brisbane, he averaged 10.3 points, 8.2 rebounds and 3.0 assists per game.

Whippy returned to Australia in June 2013 and joined the Northside Wizards of the Queensland Basketball League. In his first game for Northside, in round five against the Brisbane Capitals, he recorded 14 rebounds to go with seven points and five assists. He appeared in 14 games for Northside in 2013, averaging 12.6 points, 9.6 rebounds, 3.7 assists and a league-leading 3.1 steals per game.

Chile
In September 2013, Whippy moved to Chile and joined CD Universidad Católica of the Liga Nacional de Básquetbol de Chile. In 13 regular season games with Católica, Whippy averaged a league-leading 2.8 steals per game. After Católica was knocked out of the playoffs with a 2–1 semi-final series loss to CD Liceo Mixto, Whippy departed Chile in December 2013.

New Zealand
In January 2014, Whippy signed with the Otago Nuggets for the 2014 New Zealand NBL season. After debuting with 17 rebounds against the Southland Sharks, a ruptured Achilles suffered at training ruled him out for the rest of the season.

On September 29, 2014, Whippy signed with the Canterbury Rams for the 2015 New Zealand NBL season. In 18 games for Canterbury, he averaged 7.8 points, 7.0 rebounds, 2.7 assists and 2.3 steals per game.

In December 2015, Whippy re-signed with the Rams for the 2016 season. He helped the Rams finish the regular season in first place with a 13–5 record. It marked the Rams' first playoff appearance since 2002 and their first regular season title since 1993. In their semi-final match-up with the fourth-seeded Super City Rangers, the Rams were defeated 104–85. He appeared in all 19 games for the Rams in 2016, averaging 9.2 points, 5.5 rebounds, 2.9 assists and 1.9 steals per game.

On October 17, 2016, Whippy re-signed with the Rams for the 2017 season. The Rams finished the regular season in fourth place with a 10–8 record, and lost in the semi-finals to the Wellington Saints. He appeared in all 19 games for the Rams in 2016, averaging 6.4 points, 6.8 rebounds, 3.5 assists and 1.7 steals per game.

In August 2017, Whippy was retained by the Rams for the 2018 season. However, he was re-classed as an import under new league rules, where Oceania players are no longer permitted to play as locals. The Rams opted to move in a different direction with their imports late in pre-season, with Whippy and the Rams controversially parting ways in April 2018.

National team career
Whippy was a member of the Fijian national basketball team in 2004, 2005, 2007, 2009, 2015, 2017 and 2019. He helped Fiji win gold at the 2007 South Pacific Games, silver at the 2015 Pacific Games and bronze at the 2019 Pacific Games.

Personal
Whippy and his wife, Valmene, have two daughters. Whippy plays alongside his brothers, Leonard and Waymann, with the Fijian national team.

Whippy is one of six children to father Paul and mother Olive: older sister Majori, older brother Leonard, younger brother Waymann, and younger twin brothers Jared and Joshua. He also has an adopted sister, Jodie. Both Jared and Joshua are on rugby scholarships in the United States at Brigham Young University (BYU).

Whippy is a basketball coach at Christchurch's Hillmorton High School.

References

External links
Marques Whippy at rams.org.nz
Marques Whippy at foxsportspulse.com

1986 births
Living people
Bàsquet Mallorca players
BYU–Hawaii Seasiders men's basketball players
Canterbury Rams players
Fijian expatriate basketball people in Australia
Fijian expatriate basketball people in Chile
Fijian expatriate basketball people in New Zealand
Fijian expatriate basketball people in Spain
Fijian expatriate basketball people in the United States
Fijian men's basketball players
Fijian Latter Day Saints
Fijian Mormon missionaries
Fijian people of British descent
Fijian people of I-Taukei Fijian descent
Otago Nuggets players
Power forwards (basketball)
Sportspeople from Suva